Alan John Mellor (born 4 July 1959) is a former English cricketer who played first-class cricket for Derbyshire between 1978 and 1979.

Mellor was born in Horninglow, Staffordshire. He made his first-class debut for Derbyshire in the 1978 season against Kent when he took five wickets for 52. He took 9 wickets in the season. He continued until the end of the 1979 season

Mellor was a left-arm slow bowler and a right-handed batsman.  Mellor played three Youth Test matches and one Youth ODI, during the summer of 1978 against the West Indies.

More than five years later, Mellor resurfaced to play for his home county of Staffordshire in the Minor Counties Trophy.

External links
Alan Mellor at Cricket Archive 

1959 births
English cricketers
Living people
Derbyshire cricketers
Staffordshire cricketers